Luisa Ferida, real surname Manfrini, (18 March 1914 – 30 April 1945) was an Italian stage and film actress. She was one of divas in Italian cinema during  decade 1935-1945 and she was the highest paid movie star of that period.  The actress was famous as a films diva and she is remembered for her tragic death; in fact during the period of anti-fascist vendettas, immediately after Italian Civil War, she was assassinated, as was later proved by the Milan Court of Appeal, by shooting following a summary trial carried out by some criminal partisans: she was shot with her lover, the actor and member of Decima Flottiglia MAS Osvaldo Valenti, as accused of alleged and hypothetical participation in war crimes and torture in connection with so-called Koch gang, facts of which she was then deemed innocent after the war. Therefore a war pension was allocated to the mother, who had no other source of income.

Career
Born Luisa Manfrini Farnet in Castel San Pietro Terme, near Bologna, Ferida started as a stage actress. In 1935 she made her first appearance in film with a supporting role in La Freccia d'oro. Because of her photogenic looks and talent as an actress, she soon graduated to leading roles by the end of the 1930s.

In 1939, while working on Un Avventura di Salvator Rosa (1940), directed by Alessandro Blasetti, she met the actor Osvaldo Valenti. The pair became romantically involved and had a son.

Death by criminal partisans
Valenti had been linked with many Fascist officials and personalities for years and he eventually joined the Italian Social Republic, and for this reasons he was on the partisans' hit list. He was finally arrested in Milan, alongside a pregnant Ferida in April 1945. They were both sentenced to be executed and shot immediately in the street, without any proper trial. The partisan chief who organized the execution, Giuseppe "Vero" Marozin, during trial by Milano's tribunal, defended himself declaring that the partisan leader who by telephone ordered the two actors to be executed was Sandro Pertini, who during the year 1978 became president of the Italian republic: this version is confirmed by enciclopedia Treccani. Few sources affirm the crime is attributed solely to Marozin.

Cultural references
The film Sanguepazzo starring  Luca Zingaretti and Monica Bellucci discusses Luisa Ferida's relationship with Osvaldo Valenti.  The film premiered at the 2008 Cannes Film Festival.

Partial filmography

 Golden Arrow (1935) - Evelyn - figlia di Sleiden
 The Joker King (1936) - Trottola
 The Amnesiac (1936) - Giulietta
 The Two Sergeants (1936) - Lauretta Fracassa
 The Ambassador (1936)
 Il grande silenzio (1936) - La figlia dell'ucciso
 White Amazons (1936)
 The Castiglioni Brothers (1937) - Nina Castiglioni
 Tomb of the Angels (1937) - Luisa
 The Three Wishes (1937) - Maria Lauri
 I due barbieri (1937)
 The Count of Brechard (1938) - Maria
 All of Life in One Night (1938) - Maria
 L'argine (1938) - Sina
 Il suo destino (1938) - Maria, la ballerina
 Star of the Sea (1938) - Luisa
 Mad Animals (1939) - Maria Luisa
 An Adventure of Salvator Rosa (1939) - Lucrezia
 Il segreto di Villa Paradiso (1940) - Mary, la cantante
 La fanciulla di Portici (1940) - Lucia
 The Iron Crown (1941) - Kavaora, madre di Tundra & Tundra
 Blood Wedding (1941) - Nazaria
 Amore imperiale (1941) - La principessa Elisabetta di Russia
 The Jester's Supper (1942) - Fiammetta
 Headlights in the Fog (1942) - Piera
 L'ultimo addio (1942) - Irene Serra
 Sleeping Beauty (1942) - Carmela
 Orizzonte di sangue (1942) - Daria
 Fedora (1942) - Fedora
 Jealousy (1942) - Agrippina Solmo
 Knights of the Desert (1942) - Ara
 The Son of the Red Corsair (1943) - Carmen
 Sad Loves (1943)
 Tristi amori (1943) - Emma Scarli
 Grazia (1943)
 The Innkeeper (1944) - Mirandolina
 Fatto di cronaca (1945) - (final film role)

References

External links

 
 

1914 births
1945 deaths
People from Castel San Pietro Terme
People executed by Italy by firing squad
Executed Italian women
Italian film actresses
Italian stage actresses
20th-century Italian actresses
Deaths by firearm in Italy
People of the Italian Social Republic